Rutland is a city in Sargent County, North Dakota, United States. The population was 163 at the 2020 census. Rutland was founded in 1887.

Geography
Rutland is located at  (46.052670, -97.506656).

Demographics

2010 census
As of the census of 2010, there were 163 people, 84 households, and 46 families residing in the city. The racial makeup of the city was 97.5% White, 1.2% Native American, 0.6% Asian, and 0.6% from two or more races.

There were 84 households, of which 26.2% had children under the age of 18 living with them, 47.6% were married couples living together, 6.0% had a female householder with no husband present, 1.2% had a male householder with no wife present, and 45.2% were non-families. 45.2% of all households were made up of individuals, and 15.5% had someone living alone who was 65 years of age or older. The average household size was 1.94 and the average family size was 2.70.

The median age in the city was 48.5 years. 20.2% of residents were under the age of 18; 3.7% were between the ages of 18 and 24; 21.5% were from 25 to 44; 33.8% were from 45 to 64; and 20.9% were 65 years of age or older. The gender makeup of the city was 55.2% male and 44.8% female.

2000 census
As of the census of 2000, there were 220 people, 91 households, and 53 families residing in the city. The population density was 581.3 people per square mile (223.5/km). There were 102 housing units at an average density of 269.5 per square mile (103.6/km). The racial makeup of the city was 97.27% White, 1.36% Native American, 0.45% Asian, and 0.91% from two or more races.

There were 91 households, out of which 29.7% had children under the age of 18 living with them, 54.9% were married couples living together, 3.3% had a female householder with no husband present, and 40.7% were non-families. 39.6% of all households were made up of individuals, and 24.2% had someone living alone who was 65 years of age or older. The average household size was 2.42 and the average family size was 3.35.

In the city, the population was spread out, with 33.6% under the age of 18, 2.7% from 18 to 24, 23.6% from 25 to 44, 20.9% from 45 to 64, and 19.1% who were 65 years of age or older. The median age was 38 years. For every 100 females, there were 126.8 males. For every 100 females age 18 and over, there were 105.6 males.

The median income for a household in the city was $26,786, and the median income for a family was $34,167. Males had a median income of $29,375 versus $17,321 for females. The per capita income for the city was $14,064. About 7.1% of families and 20.3% of the population were below the poverty line, including 23.0% of those under the age of eighteen and 38.6% of those 65 or over.

Additional images

External links
Rutland's 90th anniversary : Rutland, North Dakota, 1882-1972 from the Digital Horizons website

References

Cities in Sargent County, North Dakota
Cities in North Dakota
Populated places established in 1887
1887 establishments in Dakota Territory